James M. Long (born November 15, 1862 in Louisville, Kentucky – December 12, 1932 in Louisville, Kentucky), was an American baseball player who played outfielder in the Major Leagues from 1891 to 1893. He played for the Baltimore Orioles and Louisville Colonels.

References

1862 births
1932 deaths
Major League Baseball outfielders
Baltimore Orioles (NL) players
19th-century baseball players
Louisville Colonels players
Mobile Swamp Angels players
Canton Nadjys players
Mobile Blackbirds players
Atlanta Firecrackers players
Charleston Seagulls players
Milwaukee Brewers (minor league) players
Binghamton Bingoes players
Allentown Buffaloes players
Atlanta Atlantas players
New Bedford Whalers (baseball) players
New Bedford Browns players
New Orleans Pelicans (baseball) players
Paterson Giants players
Baseball players from Kentucky